The following lists events that happened during 2012 in Colombia.

Incumbents
 President: Juan Manuel Santos
 Vice President: Angelino Garzón

Events

February
 February 26 - The Revolutionary Armed Forces of Colombia or FARC announces that it has abandoned kidnapping and will soon release its last remaining captives.

March
 March 26 - Colombian forces kill 32 FARC rebels in the latest government offensive.

April
 April 2 - FARC releases its last remaining police and military captives.
 April 5 - Russian businessman Victor Bout is sentenced to 25 years in prison for smuggling weapons to FARC.
 April 15 - The U.S. Secret Service announces it has put 11 agents on leave while it investigates alleged "inappropriate conduct" in Cartagena before the 6th Summit of the Americas there attended by U.S. President Barack Obama. It emerges that five soldiers are also facing investigation.
 April 16 - The U.S. military's top officer Martin Dempsey speaks of being "embarrassed" and tells a Pentagon news conference "we let the boss down" in relation to allegations that United States Secret Service agents habitually associated with prostitutes in Colombia. Pentagon spokesman George E. Little tells reporters that the number of military staff involved could be more than the five originally reported.
 April 19 - An agent at the center of the U.S. prostitution scandal in Colombia denied one of his escorts $770 from an agreed fee of $800, according to The New York Times, thus prompting the row that revealed the scandal to the public.
 April 21 - The U.S. Secret Service dismisses three more employees over the prostitution scandal involving U.S. agents at last weekend's 6th Summit of the Americas in Colombia.
 April 23 - White House lawyers launch an internal investigation into the role its advance staff may have played in the U.S. Secret Service sex scandal in Colombia, though no evidence has been found to implicate anyone in the scandal.
 April 27 - The Revolutionary Armed Forces of Colombia (FARC) kills eight people in two separate attacks.
 April 29 - Revolutionary Armed Forces of Colombia kill four members of Colombian Army on a mission to destroy cocaine laboratories in Caquetá Department with another four soldiers, a police officer and a French journalist missing.

 
Years of the 21st century in Colombia
2010s in Colombia
Colombia
Colombia